Norwood High School (NHS) is a four-year public secondary school located in Norwood, Massachusetts, United States, within Norfolk County.  The school is the only high school within the Norwood Public Schools district and is located at 245 Nichols Street.

Demographics

Athletics 
The Norwood Mustangs are a member of the Tri-Valley League, a league within the Massachusetts Interscholastic Athletic Association. They have a traditional rivalry with Dedham High School and Walpole High School.

In 2016, Norwood explored a move to the Tri-Valley League, similar to Dedham's move after the 2015–16 academic year. Norwood had the second-smallest enrollment of BSC schools during the 2015-16 year with 967, less than half of the largest schools in the conference. In October 2017, Norwood's move to the TVL became official. The 2017–2018 school year was the 60th and final season for Norwood's membership in the Bay State Conference.

Thanksgiving Day football rivalry
Dedham High School began playing Norwood High School in an annual football contest in 1920. Over the years, there have been several notable incidents. In 1946, thousands of fans swarmed the field for about 20 minutes after a Norwood touchdown pass was brought back on an offensive interfernce penalty. During the closing minutes of the game, the crowd threw stones and other objects at the officials. The Dedham Police Department had to escort them off the field after the game.

In 1956, seven boys from Norwood High School threw bottles of blue and white paint, the school colors, through the windows of Dedham's School Department administration building to celebrate their team's win the day before. While they admitted to the paint, they denied being involved with the smashing of 22 windows at Dedham High School on Thanksgiving Day.

Notable alumni
Richie Hebner, 1966 graduate,  Major League Baseball player, Pittsburgh Pirates, Detroit Tigers

Eric Griffin, 1992 graduate, Professional Guitarist, Murderdolls, Faster Pussycat, Genitorturers, Wednesday 13

References 

Norwood, Massachusetts
Bay State Conference
Public high schools in Massachusetts
Educational institutions established in the 1920s
Schools in Norfolk County, Massachusetts